Camoensia is a taxonomical division of genus in both plantae and animalia:
 Camoensia (plant)
 Camoensia (insect)